Enrique "Rickin" Sánchez Betancourt (June 5, 1935-January 17, 2023) was a Puerto Rican wrestling, boxing, and baseball television broadcaster, as well as a boxing promoter and television producer. He was the main broadcaster and producer used by Capitol Sports Promotions when that company's shows, mainly the one named "Superestrellas de la Lucha Libre" ("Wrestling Superstars"), were broadcast island-wide in Puerto Rico on Canal 4, then known as WAPA-TV. He left the company in 1984 after a dispute with part owner of WWC Victor Jovica. He was substituted by Hugo Savinovich.  He briefly ran a wrestling promotion in 1985.

Sánchez studied surveying at the University of Puerto Rico at Mayagüez. He was also a boxing executive, being one of the organizers of the Puerto Rican Boxing Commission, alongside Héctor Cardona, Manolo Rodríguez, Tomás Ramos Librán and the famous singer, Felipe Rodriguez. He was a native of the northern city of Canovanas, where in 2016, he was the object of a municipal dedication.

Sánchez was also formerly a radio show host, as he began his career hosting a show named "Tablero de los Deportes" ("Sports' Scoreboard"), where he joined to substitute the legendary Puerto Rican basketball player, Fufi Santori.

Television channel founder 
Sánchez was the founder of a popular but short-lived television channel in Puerto Rico, named "Videomax", based at WRFB channel 52.

Personal life and death 
in 2016 Sánchez was inducted to the University of Puerto Rico at Mayagüez Sports Hall of Fame. He was married to Blanche Vidal. His son, Rickin Sánchez, Jr., who was born from his marriage to Vidal, was also a television producer and a television director, who died in 2007.

Sánchez died on January 17, 2023. He was interred at the New Canóvanas Municipal Cemetery  Canóvanas, Puerto Rico.

Awards and accomplishments
World Wrestling League
Salón de los Inmortales (class of 2015)

See also 
List of Puerto Ricans

References 

20th-century births
Year of birth missing
2023 deaths
American mass media owners
Boxing promoters
People from Canóvanas, Puerto Rico
Professional wrestling promoters
Professional wrestling announcers
Puerto Rican sports executives and administrators
University of Puerto Rico at Mayagüez people